Lac-Simon is a town and municipality in the Outaouais region of Quebec, Canada, part of the Papineau Regional County Municipality.

It is known for its sandy beaches on Lake Simon and provides services to vacationers and campers.

History
Eight families left with him to this region where hunting and fishing were very good. Three of these families were related to the parents of his wife and from then on, the residents of Oka, and later those of Montebello, called this lake "Lake Cimon", which became "Lake Simon". The largest island in the lake is now called White Duck Island (Île du Canard Blanc) in honour of Amable LeBlanc who was nicknamed "White Duck" in reference to his slightly lighter skin colour as compared to his native relatives.

Starting in 1852, Franco-Catholic colonists began to settle at the lake, working as log drivers, loggers, or farmers. In 1857, a mission was established. In 1864, Hartwell Township is formed (named after a place in central Buckinghamshire, England), followed a few years later by the United Township Municipality of Hartwell-et-Suffolk. In 1880, the mission attained the status of parish under the name of Saint-Felix-de-Valois.

In 1881, Hartwell-et-Suffolk separated and formed the Township Municipality of Hartwell and the Township Municipality of Suffolk. In 1893, Hartwell was merged with Preston Township, becoming the United Township Municipality of Hartwell-et-Preston.

In 1936, the united townships were separated again and formed the Township Municipality of Hartwell and the Municipality of Duhamel. In 1958, Hartwell became the Parish Municipality of Chénéville and finally became the Municipality of Lac-Simon in 1965.

Lac-Simon's development as a resort area began in the 1950s, and accelerated when the provincial government acquired sites bordering the lake and opened a campground. Today, Lac-Simon is a popular year-round vacation resort.

Demographics

Mother tongue:
 English as first language: 3.8%
 French as first language: 94.8%
 English and French as first language: 0.5%
 Other as first language: 0.9%

References

External links

Incorporated places in Outaouais
Municipalities in Quebec